The 1928 William & Mary Indians football team represented the College of William & Mary as a member of the Virginia Conference during the 1928 college football season. Led by first-year head coach Branch Bocock, the Indians compiled an overall record of 6–3–2 with a mark of 5–1 in conference play, placing second in the Virginia Conference.

Schedule

References

William and Mary
William & Mary Tribe football seasons
William and Mary Indians football